Cychrus muliensis is a species of ground beetle in the subfamily of Carabinae. It was described by Deuve in 1995.

References

muliensis
Beetles described in 1995